Expelled is a 2014 American teen comedy film written and directed by Alex Goyette. The film stars Cameron Dallas, Matt Shively, Lia Marie Johnson, Marcus Johns, Andrea Russett, Kristina Hayes and Teala Dunn. Most of the cast are popular online internet personalities. The film began a limited release in theatres on December 12, 2014, before being released on video on demand December 16, 2014 by 20th Century Fox.

Plot

Felix O'Neil is a very mischievous prankster who believes that school is a waste of time. He gets expelled after receiving his third suspension from the school dean of students, Gary Truman.

For several days, Felix covers up his expulsion with the help of his best friend, Danny. A week before report cards are supposed to be mailed, Felix makes a deal with his ex-girlfriend, Vanessa, where he will help her win a class election against her rival, Stacy, and in exchange Vanessa, Mr. Truman's assistant, will print a false straight A report card for Felix. Felix and Danny hack Stacy's computer, and learn that she is a notorious cyberbully who goes by the screen-name of Roxy. Felix is able to get into the school and expose Stacy.
              
That night, Felix arrives home and finds his report card in the mail; Vanessa, however, lied and gave him Fs. Felix barely keeps his parents from finding out; in retaliation, he ruins the school play Vanessa stars in. After escaping from Truman, he is able to lie to his parents and convince Danny to help him break into school to fix his grades. Truman, however, catches him in the act, and calls the police, who arrest Felix.
              
Felix's brother Ben, who broke out of the Montana Mountain Academy by shipping himself out to their house, is able to bail Felix out. When they get home, their mom, Julie, pressures Felix about the report card and to convince Danny to give it to him. His parents are shocked, and Julie schedules a conference with his history teacher, Mr. Harris, as Mr. Harris had contacted Felix's parents about his failures in his class. Felix hires the school janitor to pose as his history teacher, who meets with Felix at his house. Ben, shocked, accidentally knocks him out. Felix, having no other choice, goes with Julie to the meeting. Ben attempts to stop the meeting, but fails. Felix's history teacher is about to tell Julie about Felix's expulsion when Ben tranquilizes him. Julie finds Ben in the hallway, and even though Felix denies knowledge of it, Julie punishes him.

Ben is sent back to the academy, but not before planning his next escape; meanwhile, Julie is doing everything to meet with Truman about Felix. A delivery pizza girl, Katie, convinces him to find a way to get Truman to re-enroll him. After getting into the school, they see Truman late at night, doing something on his computer. Deducing something is suspicious, Felix convinces Danny to bug Truman’s computer, and learns that Truman is a gambling addict who has stolen some school money to support his addiction. Felix blackmails Truman to re-enroll him, threatening to report him to the police for embezzlement if he refuses. Truman begins the re-enrollment process, but Vanessa sees Felix's name on the form, and eventually figures out that Felix is blackmailing him. She agrees to help Truman, and steals back the evidence of his addiction, in the form of Danny's hard drive.

After Felix and Danny realize that the evidence is missing, they head to the school, where Truman gloats to Felix about beating him. Danny, however, steals Truman's laptop, which has clear evidence of his activity. Julie arrives, and Truman lies about Felix, stating that he is an exemplary student, that he has participated in many extra-curricular activities, and that Felix's "Straight A" report card was not faked. Julie's suspicions about the report card being false are therefore relieved. Julie was wrong about Felix and apologize to him.

Felix is later re-enrolled for the next semester at Eastwood High, and wins Katie's affection. Although he still does not understand the importance of education, he begins to apply himself  and earns improved grades.

Cast
 Cameron Dallas as Felix O'Neil, a prankster
 Matt Shively as Danny, Felix's best friend
 Lia Marie Johnson as Katie, a pizza delivery girl who becomes Felix's girlfriend 
 Marcus Johns as Ben O'Neil, Felix's brother 
 Andrea Russett as Vanessa, Felix's ex-girlfriend
 Emilio Palame as Gary Truman, the school dean
 Kristina Hayes as Julie O'Neil, Felix's mom 
 Teala Dunn as Emily, Vanessa's best friend
 Michelle Glavin as Stacy, a student who accused Felix of spying on her in the restroom in freshman year
 Circus-Szalewski as Shamus, the school janitor
 Tom McLaren as Phil O'Neil, Felix's dad 
 Stevie Mack as Mr. Harris, Felix's history teacher
 Rene Aranda as Felix's arresting officer

Production
In April 2014, AwesomenessTV CEO Brian Robbins announced he was making a film starring Dallas. In September 2014, it was revealed that Cameron Dallas, Andrea Russett, Teala Dunn, Lia Marie Johnson and Matt Shively had all joined the cast of the film. Russett wrapped her scenes on September 23, 2014. Production on the film ended on October 9, 2014.

Release
The film was released in a limited release on December 12, 2014, prior to being released on video on demand on December 16, 2014.  Expelled rocketed to the top of the digital charts on iTunes and most other digital platforms on its first day of release, and has been called a "case study in how to make money from younger consumers with movies." The film was released on Netflix worldwide beginning on February 1, 2015.

With Viacom's acquisition of AwesomenessTV in 2018, the distribution rights for the movie are once again overseen by Brian Robbins who was named head of Viacom's Paramount Pictures in 2021.

Reception
Nicolas Rapold, writing for The New York Times, felt Dallas was unable to carry a feature film, stating "Stretched over an 85-minute feature[...] Mr. Dallas' brand of easy goofing just feels like coasting." while Sherilyn Connelly from The Village Voice felt that "...Expelled isn't going to change the world, but it's a fun and promising debut film."

References

External links
 
 
 

2010s teen comedy films
20th Century Fox direct-to-video films
American high school films
American teen comedy films
Awesomeness Films films
2014 directorial debut films
Films shot in Los Angeles County, California
2014 comedy films
2010s English-language films
2010s American films